This is a list of notable people who were born or have lived in Accra, Ghana.

Born in Accra

1901–1970 

 Gottlieb Ababio Adom (1904–1979), educator, journalist, editor and Presbyterian clergyman
 Mabel Dove Danquah (190–1984), journalist, political activist, and creative writer
 Joseph Arthur Ankrah (1915–1992), 2nd President of Ghana
 Saka Acquaye (1923–2007), musician, playwright, artist

 Guy Warren (1923–2008), musician
 James Barnor (born 1929), photographer
 Peter Ala Adjetey (1931–2008), Speaker of the Parliament of Ghana from 2001 to 2005
 Love Allotey (1936–1996), boxer
 Eddie Blay (1937–2006), boxer
 Floyd Robertson (1937–1983), boxer
 Clement Quartey (born 1938), boxer
 Fred Aryee (born 1939), Nigerian footballer
 Mustapha Tettey Addy (born 1942), master drummer
 Nana Akufo-Addo (born 1944), President of Ghana
 Margaret Busby, publisher, editor and writer
 Oliver Acquah (born 1946), footballer
 Jerry Rawlings (born 1947–2020), President of Ghana from 1993 to 2001
 Souad Faress (born 1948), stage, radio, television and film actress.
 David Kotei (born 1950), boxer
 William Boyd (born 1952), Scottish novelist, short story writer and screenwriter
 Abena Busia (born 1953), writer, poet, lecturer and diplomat
 Hugh Quarshie (born 1954), actor

 Robert Bathurst (born 1957), English actor
 Azumah Nelson (born 1958), boxer
 Peter Mensah (born 1959), Ghanaian-British actor
 Nana (born 1968), German rapper and DJ
 Marcel Desailly (born 1968), French footballer
 Ali Ibrahim Pelé (born 1969), footballer
 Ike Quartey (born 1969), boxer

1971–1980 

 Joe Addo (born 1971), footballer
 Komla Dumor (1972–2014), journalist
 Bernard Aryee (born 1973), football player
 Kwame Ayew (born 1973), footballer
 Eben Dugbatey (born 1973), football defender
 Samuel Johnson (born 1973), footballer
 Ohene Kennedy (born 1973), footballer
 Leonard Myles-Mills (born 1973), athlete
 Alex Nyarko (born 1973), footballer
 Joachim Yaw (born 1973), footballer
 Augustine Ahinful (born 1974), footballer
 Charles Akonnor (born 1974), footballer
 Joseph Aziz (born 1974), footballer
 Kofi Amoah Prah (born 1974), German long jumper
 Yaw Preko (born 1974), footballer
 Finley Quaye (born 1974), musician
 Godfried Aduobe (born 1975), footballer
 Charles Amoah (born 1975), footballer
 Daniel Addo (born 1976), footballer
 Emmanuel Osei Kuffour (born 1976), footballer
 Aziz Zakari (born 1976), athlete
 Owusu Benson (born 1977), football player
 Joshua Clottey (born 1977), boxer
 Eric Addo (born 1978), footballer
 Patrick Allotey (1978–2007), footballer
 Richard Kingson (born 1978), football goalkeeper
 Isaac Kuoki (born 1978), football attacking midfielder
 Christian Saba (born 1978), footballer
 Lawrence Adjei (born 1979), footballer
 Junior Agogo (born 1979), footballer
 Osumanu Adama (born 1980), boxer
 Sammy Adjei (born 1980), footballer
 Joseph Agbeko (born 1980), boxer
 Eric Akoto (born 1980), Togolese footballer
 Stephen Appiah (born 1980), footballer
 Baffour Gyan (born 1980), footballer
 Elvis Hammond (born 1980), footballer
 Abdullah Quaye (born 1980), footballer

1981–1990 

 Riga Mustapha (born 1981), Dutch footballer
 Emmanuel Pappoe (born 1981), footballer
 Ishmael Addo (born 1982), football striker
 Lawrence Aidoo (born 1982), footballer
 Michael Essien (born 1982), footballer
 Anthony Obodai (born 1982), footballer
 Daniel Ola (born 1982), Ghanaian-Nigerian footballer
 George Owu (born 1982), footballer
 Razak Pimpong (born 1982), footballer
 Ahkan (born 1983), musician and songwriter
 Vida Anim (born 1983), sprinter
 Derek Boateng (born 1983), footballer
 Yussif Chibsah (born 1983), footballer
 Ahmed Barusso (born 1984), footballer
 Ibrahim Abdul Razak (born 1983), footballer
 Fred Benson (born 1984), Dutch-Ghanaian footballer
 Lawrence Quaye (born 1984), Qatari footballer
 Charles Takyi (born 1984), footballer
 Ruky Abdulai (born 1985), Canadian long jumper and heptathlete
 Abdul Razak Alhassan (born 1985), mixed martial artist
 Asamoah Gyan (born 1985), footballer
 Bennard Yao Kumordzi (born 1985), footballer
 Anthony Annan (born 1986), footballer
 Mohammed-Awal Issah (born 1986), footballer
 Prince Tagoe (born 1986), footballer
 Alexander Tettey (born 1986), Norwegian footballer
 Samuel Yeboah (born 1986), footballer
 John Boye (born 1987), footballer
 Emmanuel Clottey (born 1987), footballer
 Brimah Razak (born 1987), footballer
 Jerry Akaminko (born 1988), footballer
 Kwadwo Asamoah (born 1988), footballer
 Mohamed Awal (born 1988), footballer
 Cofie Bekoe (born 1988), footballer
 Davidson Eden (born 1988), German-Ghanaian footballer
 Mohammed Haruna (born 1988), footballer
 Ernest Sowah (born 1988), footballer
 Isaac Vorsah (born 1988), footballer
 Dominic Adiyiah (born 1989), footballer
 Mohammed Rabiu (born 1989), footballer
 Seidu Yahaya (born 1989), footballer
 David Accam (born 1990), footballer
 Lee Addy (born 1990), footballer
 Kalif Alhassan (born 1990), footballer
 Jonathan Mensah (born 1990), footballer
 Daniel Opare (born 1990), footballer

1991–2000 

 Mohammed Abu (born 1991), footballer
 Gideon Baah (born 1991), footballer
 Jamin Beats (born 1991), Afro pop singer, producer, song writer
 Daniel Kofi Agyei (born 1992), footballer
 Mohammed Fatau (born 1992), footballer
 Mahatma Otoo (born 1992), footballer
 Frank Acheampong (born 1993), footballer
 Ebenezer Assifuah (born 1993), footballer
 Joshua Buatsi (born 1993), British boxer
 Raman Chibsah (born 1993), footballer
 Alfred Duncan (born 1993), footballer
 Nadia Eke (born 1993), triple jumper
 Ibrahim Moro (born 1993), footballer
 Daniel Amartey (born 1994), footballer
 Eugene Ansah (born 1994), footballer
 Emmanuel Boateng (born 1994), footballer
 Joseph Larweh Attamah (born 1994), footballer
 Isaac Dogboe (born 1994), boxer
 Bernard Mensah (born 1994), footballer
 Clifford Aboagye (born 1995), footballer
 Bernard Kyere (born 1995), footballer
 Wahab Ackwei (born 1996), footballer
 Thomas Agyepong (born 1996), footballer
 Godfred Donsah (born 1996), footballer
 Lumor Agbenyenu (born 1996), footballer
 William Opoku (born 1997), footballer
 Benjamin Tetteh (born 1997), footballer
 Gifty Ayew Asare (born 1998), footballer
 Joseph Paintsil (born 1998), footballer
 Hans Nunoo Sarpei (born 1998), footballer
 Francis Amuzu (born 1999), Belgian footballer
 Halutie Hor (born 1999), sprinter
 Roberto Massimo (born 2000), German footballer
 Najeeb Yakubu (born 2000), footballer
Maxine Adjei-Dadson (born 2000), Ghanaian person

Lived in Accra 
 Stephen Adei (born 1948), educationist, writer, economist and motivational speaker
 Zanetor Agyeman-Rawlings, the eldest daughter of the 1st President under the 4th Republic of Ghana Jerry Rawlings

References 

Accra
Accra